The Murrindal River is a perennial river of the Snowy River catchment, located in the East Gippsland region of the Australian state of Victoria.

Course and features
The Murrindal River rises below Butchers Ridge, and flows generally south, joined by one minor tributary, before reaching its confluence with the Buchan River west of Lucas Point in the Shire of East Gippsland. The river descends  over its  course.

At the locality of Murrindal, the river is traversed by the Gelantipy Road.

The traditional custodians of the land surrounding the upper reaches of the Murrindal River are the Australian Aboriginal Bidawal and Nindi-Ngudjam Ngarigu Monero peoples; while in its lower reaches, the Gunaikurnai people identify the land surrounding  as their traditional country.

See also

 List of rivers of Australia

References

External links
 
 
 
 

East Gippsland catchment
Rivers of Gippsland (region)